Ouvrage Champ de Tir, also known as Champ de Tir de l'Agaisen (Agaisen firing range) is a lesser work (petit ouvrage) of the Maginot Line's Alpine extension, the Alpine Line. The ouvrage consists of two entry blocks and one infantry block, sited to control the valley of the Nieya and to observe for l'Agaisen.

Description 
Block 1 (entry): one machine gun embrasure.
Block 2 (infantry): one machine gun embrasure.
Block 3 (infantry): one Machine gun cloche and one twin machine gun embrasure.

The ouvrage is closed to the public.

See also 
 List of Alpine Line ouvrages

References

Bibliography 
Allcorn, William. The Maginot Line 1928-45. Oxford: Osprey Publishing, 2003. 
Kaufmann, J.E. and Kaufmann, H.W. Fortress France: The Maginot Line and French Defenses in World War II, Stackpole Books, 2006. 
Kaufmann, J.E., Kaufmann, H.W., Jancovič-Potočnik, A. and Lang, P. The Maginot Line: History and Guide, Pen and Sword, 2011. 
Mary, Jean-Yves; Hohnadel, Alain; Sicard, Jacques. Hommes et Ouvrages de la Ligne Maginot, Tome 1. Paris, Histoire & Collections, 2001.  
Mary, Jean-Yves; Hohnadel, Alain; Sicard, Jacques. Hommes et Ouvrages de la Ligne Maginot, Tome 4 - La fortification alpine. Paris, Histoire & Collections, 2009.  
Mary, Jean-Yves; Hohnadel, Alain; Sicard, Jacques. Hommes et Ouvrages de la Ligne Maginot, Tome 5. Paris, Histoire & Collections, 2009.

External links 
 Agaisen (petit ouvrage du champ de tir) at fortiff.be 
 

CHAM
Maginot Line
Alpine Line